Trachydoras nattereri is a species of thorny catfish native to the Amazon basin of Brazil, Colombia and Peru.  This species grows to a length of  SL.

References 
 

Doradidae
Freshwater fish of Brazil
Freshwater fish of Colombia
Freshwater fish of Peru
Fish described in 1881
Taxa named by Franz Steindachner